The Association of European Performers' Organisations AEPO-ARTIS unites 37 collective management organisations for performers operating in 27 European countries, and represents  them at European  level. It is a non-profit organisation.

See also

 Collective rights management
 Related rights

External links
AEPO-ARTIS website

Music organisations based in Belgium
Copyright collection societies
Intellectual property organizations
Organizations established in 1994
Intellectual property law in Europe
European trade associations
International cultural organizations
Pan-European music organizations
Music licensing organizations